Saint-Antoine is a community in Kent County, New Brunswick, Canada. It is 35 km north of Moncton and 18 km Southwest of Bouctouche. Saint-Antoine is on Route 115 and Route 525.

On 1 January 2023, Saint-Antoine amalgamated with all or part of six local service districts to form the new town of Champdoré. The community's name remains in official use.

History

The village is named in honour of Anthony the Great. From 1966, it was called St. Anthony until it was changed to Saint-Antoine in 1969. The village was originally called Higho Settlement. Saint-Antoine was the birthplace of Louis Robichaud, Canada's first elected Acadian provincial premier.

Demographics

Population trend 

Religious make-up (2001)

Income (2006)

Mother tongue (2016)

Notable people

See also
List of communities in New Brunswick

References

External links 
Village of Saint-Antoine

Communities in Kent County, New Brunswick
Former villages in New Brunswick
Communities in Greater Moncton